HD 74423 is a heartbeat binary star and one component pulsates on only one hemisphere. This is caused by tidal interaction with its partner. The star is located in the Volans constellation.

HD 74423 is slightly variable in brightness.  It fluctuates between magnitudes 8.58 and 8.66 every 19 hours. The exact variability type is unclear.  It was initially found in a search for α2 Canum Venaticorum variables and assumed to be one, but has since been considered to be a δ Scuti variable. The spectrum shows unusually strong absorption lines of some iron peak elements, a characteristic of λ Boötis stars.  Both components are thought to show the chemical peculiarity.

References

External links
 Press release

Volans (constellation)
074423
Lambda Boötis stars
A-type main-sequence stars
Durchmusterung objects
Delta Scuti variables
Alpha2 Canum Venaticorum variables
Rotating ellipsoidal variables